Portes-lès-Valence (literally Portes near Valence) is a commune in the Drôme department in southeastern France. It is a suburb of Valence.

Geography
Portes-lès-Valence is situated in the south side of Valence and it is part of its urban area.

Population

International relations
Portes-lès-Valance is twinned with:
 Baronissi - Italy (2006)

See also
Communes of the Drôme department

References

External links

 Official site of Portes-lès-Valence

Communes of Drôme